Park Ji-hyun (박지현 born 7 April 2000) is a South Korean basketball player for the South Korean national team and Asan Woori Bank Wibee of the Women’s Korean Basketball League (WKBL).

Early life and high school career
Park's interest in sports began from an early age and she started playing basketball in elementary school with her older brother. As a student at Soongeui Girls' High School, she stood out for her versatility, earning a call-up to the senior national team for the 2018 Asian Games. She was the first Korean female basketball player to receive an invitation to the "Basketball Without Borders" Global Camp in 2018 and was one of the All-Stars.

Professional career

WKBL 
In 2018, Park was drafted first overall in the first round of the Women’s Korean Basketball League Draft and began her professional career with the Asan Woori Bank Wibee for the 2018-19 season. In 2019, she won the WKBL Rookie Award for the 2018-19 season.

During the 2020-21 season, she averaged 15.4 points, 10.4 rebounds, 3 assists, 1.7 steals, 1.2 blocks per game and was named to the WKBL League Best 5.

National Team Career

Youth Level 
Park represented South Korea at the 2016 FIBA Under-17 World Championship for Women in Spain. In six games, she led the tournament with 16.5 points per game and also averaged 7.7 rebounds, 2.8 assists, 3.3 steals and 0.7 blocks per game. In a game against the United States, Park recorded 17 points, 10 rebounds, 2 assists, 3 steals in a matchup against Charli Collier, the first overall pick in the 2021 WNBA Draft.

Park also played at the 2017 FIBA Under-19 Women’s Basketball World Cup in Italy and led the team in points (15.1), rebounds (5.6), assists (3.3) and steals (3.3).

At the 2019 FIBA Under-19 Women’s Basketball World Cup in Bangkok, Thailand, Park led the tournament with 16.4 points per game and 3.9 steals per game. Park posted 26 points, 7 rebounds, 4 steals and 1 block in a loss against the United States (highlights) and future WNBA prospects Paige Bueckers, Ashley Joens, and Aliyah Boston. After the game, U.S. coach Jeff Walz commented "She’s talented, she really put it to us in our game. We had a really hard time defending her. She scored behind the three-point line, she drove and hit the pull-up jump shot. She’s a very good basketball player."

Senior Level 
Park made her debut with the senior national team, at the 2018 Jakarta-Palembang Asian Games and also participated at the 2018 FIBA Women’s Basketball World Cup.

Park represented South Korea in the 2020 Tokyo Olympics and averaged 8.3 points, 4 rebounds, and 2 assists during the Olympics. In a game against Serbia on August 1, 2021, Ji-hyun recorded 17 points, 7 rebounds, 5 assists and a steal.

Personal life 
Park has an older brother Park Ji-won, who is also a professional basketball player. He played college basketball for Yonsei University and was drafted by Suwon KT Sonicboom in 2020.

She is represented by Gervin Global Management, a sports and entertainment management company founded by George "The Iceman" Gervin.

References

External links

2000 births
Living people
Forwards (basketball)
People from Seongnam
South Korean women's basketball players
Basketball players at the 2018 Asian Games
Asian Games silver medalists for Korea
Asian Games medalists in basketball
Medalists at the 2018 Asian Games
Basketball players at the 2020 Summer Olympics
Olympic basketball players of South Korea
Sportspeople from Gyeonggi Province